Tabea Lara Alt (born 18 March 2000) is a former German elite artistic gymnast. She is the 2017 World bronze medalist on balance beam, and a 2016 Olympian. She competed at the 2016 Gymnastics Olympic Test Event, contributing to the team placing of second, which qualified the German team for the 2016 Summer Olympics.  At the 2016 Summer Olympics, the German team finished 6th in the team all-around competition.

Career

2016 
At the 2016 American Cup, Alt finished seventh in the all-around with a score of 54.399. She competed at the 2016 Gymnastics Olympic Test Event in April. There she helped her team qualify for the 2016 Summer Olympics with a team finish of second place. Individually, she was third in the all-around. At the 2016 Rio Summer Olympics, the German team finished 6th in the team all-around competition. Alt did not qualify for any of the event finals.

2017 
Alt won the 2017 Stuttgart World Cup in March 2017, beating Angelina Melnikova and Morgan Hurd. Alt would also go on to win the 2017 London World Cup in April, placing ahead of Angelina Melnikova, Victoria Nguyen and Amy Tinkler. At the 2017 European Championships, she finished ninth on balance beam (10.966) after qualifying in fifth place (13.700).

In the 2017 World Gymnastics Championships in Montreal, Canada, Tabea Alt qualified first into the balance beam final, and won the bronze medal with the score 13.300, behind her teammate Pauline Schäfer and Morgan Hurd from the USA.

In December 2017, the Alt and the Alt II were added to the Code of Points. Alt debuted both uneven bars elements at the 2017 World Championships.

2018 
In October 2018, Alt had surgery on a persistent shoulder injury.

Eponymous skills 
Alt has two eponymous skill listed in the Code of Points.

References

External links
 
 
 

2000 births
Living people
German female artistic gymnasts
Sportspeople from Stuttgart (region)
Gymnasts at the 2016 Summer Olympics
Olympic gymnasts of Germany
Medalists at the World Artistic Gymnastics Championships
Originators of elements in artistic gymnastics
21st-century German women
People from Ludwigsburg